Serena Ryder Live is the debut live album by Ontario singer Serena Ryder, recorded in The Black Sheep Inn in Wakefield, Quebec, Canada, in October 2002 by Bill Stunt and mastered by James Paul at Rogue Studio. It was originally recorded for broadcast on the CBC Radio program, Bandwidth.

Track listing
"Hiding Place"
"Rust Looks Like Wood"
"Winter Waltz"
"Fortune's Wheel"
"Easy Enough"
"Melancholy Blue"

Credits
All songs written by Serena Ryder except track 2, written by Charlie Glasspool (SOCAN) and track 4, written by Dave Tough (SOCAN).
Recording: Bill Stunt
Mastering: James Paul, Rogue Studio

2003 live albums
Serena Ryder albums